The 1996 NCAA Division I-AA Football Championship Game was a postseason college football game between the Marshall Thundering Herd and the Montana Grizzlies. The game was played on December 21, 1996, and was the last I-AA title game contested at Marshall University Stadium, now known as Joan C. Edwards Stadium, in Huntington, West Virginia. The culminating game of the 1996 NCAA Division I-AA football season, it was a rematch of the prior season's final, and was won by Marshall, 49–29. It was also Marshall's final game in Division I-AA, now known as Division I FCS; the Herd would move to Division I-A (now Division I FBS) the following July, joining the Mid-American Conference.

Teams
The participants of the Championship Game were the finalists of the 1996 I-AA Playoffs, which began with a 16-team bracket. The location of the title game, Marshall University Stadium, was determined before the playoffs started.

Montana Grizzlies

Montana finished their regular season with a 14–0 record (8–0 in conference). Seeded first in the playoffs, the Grizzlies defeated 16-seed Nicholls State, sixth-seed East Tennessee State, and fourth-seed Troy State to reach the final. This was the second appearance for Montana in a Division I-AA championship game, as the team was the defending champion from 1995.

Marshall Thundering Herd

Marshall also finished their regular season with a 14–0 record (8–0 in conference). The Thundering Herd, seeded second, defeated 15-seed Delaware, tenth-seed Furman, and third-seed Northern Iowa to reach the final. This was the sixth appearance for Marshall in a Division I-AA championship game, having one prior win (1992) and four prior losses (1987, 1991, 1993, and 1995).

Game summary

Scoring summary

Game statistics

References

Further reading

External links
Marshall Thundering Herd 1996 football season review Vol 5 via YouTube
 

Championship Game
NCAA Division I Football Championship Games
Marshall Thundering Herd football games
Montana Grizzlies football games
Sports competitions in West Virginia
NCAA Division I-AA Football Championship Game
NCAA Division I-AA Football Championship Game